Mujrim is an Indian Bollywood movie released on 28 June 1989, directed by Umesh Mehra. The film stars Mithun Chakraborty, Madhuri Dixit, and Nutan. It also stars Amrish Puri, Shakti Kapoor, and Gulshan Grover in supporting roles. The film follows the story of Shankar, who is regarded as a criminal by the society after being in jail for ten years since childhood.

The film was a hit, earning positive reviews for the cast's performance, soundtrack, and script, while earning negative reviews for its lengthy plot. It is considered an underrated masterpiece, catching the attention of Shahrukh Khan----whose production company Red Chilles Entertainment acquired the rights to the film.

Synopsis
Shankar (Mithun Chakraborty) was jailed at the age of thirteen, when he killed his uncle, who tried to sell his mother Yashoda (Nutan) to a rich and powerful man called Khan (Amrish Puri).
He was imprisoned in jail for ten years. When he comes back home, he finds his mother and sister in poor conditions. He tries to keep appropriate behavior and make amends, but all his attempts fail, as he is widely recognized as a criminal, and he joins a group of criminals, whose leader is a generous man called Malik (Sharat Saxena). His mother, who is an honest woman, refuses to accept him like this and decides she has nothing to do with him. He meets Malik's daughter Sonia (Madhuri Dixit) and the two fall in love. Malik appreciates Shankar's faithfulness and authorizes him as his principal successor. After Malik's death, Shankar takes over and gets into business terms with Khan. Shankar and Sonia get married and move into their new house. Shankar's one and only wish is to reunite with his mother, but she refuses and requires him to leave the crime world.

The matters get complicated and Shankar loses his way. He loses his friends in endless fights with the police, and finally, when Sonia finds out that she is pregnant, she leaves him and comes to live with Yashoda. Alone and neglected, he comes back home but then his previous life persecutes him. What will be his fate in life?

Cast 

Mithun Chakraborty ... Shankar Bose
Madhuri Dixit ... Sonia
Nutan ... Yashoda Bose 
Amrish Puri ... Khan
Gulshan Grover ... Nagarajan
Shakti Kapoor ... Chandan, Shankar Friend and Sunanda Love Interest
Suresh Oberoi ... Inspector Gokhale
Pallavi Joshi ... Sunanda
Sharat Saxena ... Malik
Johnny Lever ... Lakhpati
Jagdeep ... Lakhpati
Roopesh Kumar ... Gulati
Guddi Maruti .. Sunanda's Friend
Tej Sapru ... Lucky
Mahesh Anand ... Raja
Avtar Gill ... Police Commissioner Thakkar
Salim Ghouse ... Africa assisanator
Viju Khote ... Restaurant Manager
Rajesh Puri ... Lala
Amrit Patel
Sulabha Arya ... Taramati

Music 
The movie has 6 songs composed by Anu Malik. The soundtrack album featured very well known singers Alka Yagnik and Sadhana Sargam who made here one of their first playback singing steps.

Songs
"Raat Ke Baarah Baje" - Amit Kumar, Alka Yagnik, Anu Malik
"Boom Boom Laka Laka Boom" - Mohammed Aziz, Anu Malik
"Daata Pyar De" - Sadhana Sargam 
"Mujrim Na Kehna Mujhe" - Mohammed Aziz
"Naiyo Jeena Tere Bina" - Mohammed Aziz, Sadhana Sargam
"Kukudoo Koo I Love You" - Dilraj Kaur

References

External links

1989 films
1980s Hindi-language films
Films scored by Anu Malik
Films directed by Umesh Mehra